Eva Marianne Gernandt Lundius (born 28 April 1949) is a Swedish lawyer and judge, who served as Chairwoman of the Supreme Court of Sweden from 2010 to 2016. She was appointed Justice of the Supreme Court in 1998 and was the first female President of the Supreme Court of Sweden.

Biography 
Lundius comes from a family of lawyers; both her mother and grandmother worked in the legal profession, making her third-generation lawyer on her mother's side. She graduated from Lund University with a Candidate of Law degree in 1976 and served as a district court clerk for two years after graduating. In 1978 she joined the Lagerlöf och Leman law firm and worked there for 20 years, mainly on tax law and business law cases, before being appointed Justice of the Supreme Court of Sweden in 1998. In 2010 she succeeded Johan Munck as President of the Supreme Court.

She is married to Johan Gernandt, lawyer and Moderate Party politician.

References

External links
Marianne Lundius

1949 births
Living people
Presidents of the Supreme Court of Sweden
Lund University alumni
Women chief justices